The Qvirila is a river of Georgia. It is a left affluent of the Rioni, which it joins south of the city Kutaisi.

Geographic information 
It originates in South Ossetia, in the gorges of the mountains  of the Racha Range. Most of the river is located in Georgia. After the confluence with its left tributary Dzirula it flows through flat terrain, before - through the mountains. The river is fed mainly by rain. On average, water flow per year near the city Zestafoni, located 42 kilometers from its mouth, 61 m³ / s, at the mouth of about 90 m³ /from. The river is suitable for whitewater canoeing.

The Chiatura manganese ore deposit is located in the river basin.

References

Rivers of Georgia (country)